The Occupied Times of London was a political newspaper which originated from Occupy LSX in 2011. Originally produced from the occupations at St. Paul’s and Finsbury Square, the paper included news, features and interviews. It was a free, non-profit publication without any advertising and was first published on Wednesday 26 October 2011.

The design of the Occupied Times of London incorporated Jonathan Barnbrook's 'Bastard' font, with a signature back-page placard design or slogan in each issue.

The last issue was Issue 29 March 2017 before it became Base Magazine.

References

Further reading
 
 Visual Media and Culture of Occupy. p. 41.

External links
 Official website

2011 in London
Occupy movement in the United Kingdom
Political newspapers published in the United Kingdom